The Diesel Electric Rail Motor (DERM) was a railmotor operated by the Victorian Railways of Australia.

History 
Originally built as a petrol electric rail motor (PERM), they were the longest-lived rail motor on the Victorian Railways, with the first entering service in 1928 and the last being withdrawn in 1991.

The rail motor was a standard product of the US Electro-Motive Corporation (a predecessor of Electro-Motive Diesel) and built between 1924 and 1932, albeit to a smaller loading gauge and wider track gauge. The first was imported in 1927, assembled at Newport Workshops, and placed in service in 1928. The bodies of the remaining nine were constructed at Newport Workshops using imported equipment and electrical equipment and placed in service between 1930 and 1931.

A DERM, with a DERM Trailer car attached, ran a regular passenger service on the South Gippsland line in the 1960s and 1970s. By the 1970s, the longest scheduled journey run by a DERM was the Bendigo to Robinvale run, last operated on 3 June 1978.

In 1976, RM 56 was fitted with a new seating arrangement, including rotating seats, using components from the Z carriage fleet. Capacity was reduced to 34 passengers, because the new seating arrangement was two either side of the central aisle rather than the previous two and three. The first-class end of the vehicle was moved towards the centre, closer to the engine, but providing a smoother ride by averaging the suspension of both bogies rather than just one. The trial arrangement was used on the Yarrawonga line, but patronage did not increase sufficiently to justify the retention of that service.

Following the changes to 56RM, 55RM and 61RM were extensively modified in the late 1970s, with the engines relocated, the body extended, and a new seating arrangement provided. The most obvious external difference was the fitting of aluminium-framed windows on the driver's cabin, and porthole windows for the engine room. These "Super DERMs" were a familiar sight on the adjoining Mornington and Stony Point lines prior to the early 1980s.

Details of vehicles

Motor units

Trailers

Preservation 
All but one of the DERMs have survived into preservation, with 57RM being the only DERM to have been scrapped. Four are operational, with the remaining five in various conditions, generally as a source of spare parts with long-term restoration in mind.

Of the regular DERMs, 58RM regularly runs tours on the Melbourne and Victorian broad gauge system, operated by the Diesel Electric Rail Motor Preservation Association of Victoria, and 63RM runs trips on the Daylesford line with trailer 26MT when appropriate.

55RM is allocated to the Australian Railway Historical Society Museum but was sub-allocated to the South Gippsland Railway. When the latter closed in 2016, it moved to the Yarra Valley Tourist Railway. 61RM operates on the Victorian Goldfields Railway between Maldon and Castlemaine.

See also 
 Tourist and Heritage Railways Act
 Doodlebug (rail car)
 Weitzer railmotor

References 

Victorian Railways railmotors